Felchville may refer to:

Felchville, Massachusetts, a populated place in Middlesex County
Felchville, Vermont, a populated place in Windsor County